Owned: A Tale Of Two Americas is a 2018 documentary film. The film details  discrimination in the American housing market. The film was written, directed, and produced by Giorgio Angelini.

References

External links

https://www.ownedfilm.com/

2018 documentary films
American documentary films